Francisco R. Rodríguez is a Venezuelan economist. From 2000 to 2004, he served as the head of the  economic and financial advisory of the Venezuelan National Assembly (Spanish: Oficina de Asesoría Económica y Financiera de Asamblea Nacional). He also joined Torino Economics, the economic analysis branch of New-York based Torino Capital, as chief economist between 2016 and 2019, and served as policy advisor for presidential candidate Henri Falcón in 2018.

Career 
From 2000 to 2004, he served as the head of the  economic and financial advisory of the Venezuelan National Assembly. 

Rodríguez joined Bank of America Merrill Lynch in August 2011 as Chief Andean Economist, covering the economies of Colombia, Ecuador, Peru and Venezuela.  In 2012 he successfully called the Venezuelan presidential elections with an out-of-consensus prediction that Chávez would be re-elected by a comfortable margin. He joined Torino Economics, the economic analysis branch of New-York based Torino Capital in July 2016 as chief economist. Rodríguez left Torino Economics on 3 September 2019.

In May 2016, Rodríguez was part of a group of economists under an initiative promoted by the Union of South American Nations (UNASUR) to present an economic stabilization program to the government of Nicolás Maduro, who until then had refused to implement necessary monetary and fiscal reforms to contain prices, stabilize the exchange rate and foster production recovery. The plan was shelved by the Maduro administration.

On 2018, 20 May, the candidate Henri Falcón accused Maduro of rigging the presidential elections and refused to recognize the results. Both him and Rodríguez said the election was not valid.

Bibliography

References

Living people
Year of birth missing (living people)
20th-century Venezuelan economists
Wesleyan University faculty
Andrés Bello Catholic University alumni
Harvard University alumni
21st-century Venezuelan economists